Chrome Neon Jesus is the debut studio album by American shoegaze band, Teenage Wrist. The album was released on March 9, 2018 through Epitaph Records.

Track listing

Personnel 
The following individuals were credited for the composition, artwork, and production of the album.

 Brad Blackwood — Mastering
 Kimberly Corday — Art Direction, Photography
 Carlos de la Garza — Engineer, Mixing, Producer
 Marshall Gallagher — Group Member
 Jason Link — Layout
 Kamtin Mohager — Group Member
 Anthony Salazar — Group Member
 Teenage Wrist — Composer, Primary Artist

References

External links 
Chrome Neon Jesus at Bandcamp
Chrome Neon Jesus at Epitaph Records

2018 albums
Teenage Wrist albums
Albums produced by Carlos de la Garza (music producer)
Epitaph Records albums